Sirajul Islam (1944-2 June 1996) was a Awami League politician and the former Member of Parliament of Dinajpur-2 and Panchagarh-1.

Career
Islam was elected to parliament from Dinajpur-2 as a Awami League candidate in 1973 and 1979. He was elected to parliament from Panchagarh-1 as a Awami League candidate in 1986.

Legacu
Bir Muktijoddha Sirajul Islam Stadium and Bir Muktijoddha Sirajul Islam Railway Station-Panchagarh were named after him.

References

Awami League politicians
3rd Jatiya Sangsad members
1944 births
1996 deaths
2nd Jatiya Sangsad members
1st Jatiya Sangsad members